George John Mells Jr. (born 23 May 1997) is an Australian professional footballer who plays as a central midfielder for Port Melbourne.

Football career 
Born in Melbourne, Mells played youth football for Chelsea and Southampton before returning to Australia to make his professional debut for Adelaide United in 2015.

His contract with Brisbane Roar was terminated by mutual agreement on 23 February 2021. He played no A-league games for Brisbane Roar. A couple of days later he joined NPL Victoria club Port Melbourne.

Mells has appeared numerous times for Australian youth teams, having also previously represented Greece U17s.

Honors

Club
Adelaide United
 A-League Premiership: 2015–16
 A-League Championship: 2015–16

International 
Australia U20
 AFF U-19 Youth Championship: 2016

Career statistics

Club

References

External links
 

1997 births
Living people
Association football midfielders
Australian soccer players
Australia youth international soccer players
Greek footballers
Greece youth international footballers
Chelsea F.C. players
Southampton F.C. players
Adelaide United FC players
Fortuna Sittard players
Brisbane Roar FC players
A-League Men players
Australian expatriate soccer players
Expatriate footballers in England
Greek expatriate sportspeople in England
Expatriate footballers in the Netherlands
Australian expatriate sportspeople in the Netherlands
Greek expatriate sportspeople in the Netherlands
Soccer players from Melbourne